{| border="1" cellpadding="7" cellspacing="0" style="margin: 10px 0 10px 25px; background: #f9f9f9; border: 1px #AAA solid; border-collapse: collapse; font-size: 100%; float: center;"
|- style="background: #E9E9E9"
|colspan ="7" style="background: bgcolor="#F28500" | Population of Visoko municipality
|-
|style="background: bgcolor="#F5DEB3" | year of census|style="background: bgcolor="#C2B280" | 1991.
|style="background: bgcolor="#C2B280" | 1981.|style="background: bgcolor="#C2B280" | 1971.

 |-
|style="background: bgcolor="#228B22" | ethnic Muslims|34,373 (74,46%)
|28,838 (70,50%)
|25,683 (72,34%)
|-
|style="background: bgcolor="#FF0000" | Serbs
|7,471 (16,18%)
|6,831 (16,70%)
|7,166 (20,18%)
|-
|style="background: bgcolor="#4169E1" | Croats|1,872 (4,05%)
|1,879 (4,59%)
|1,914 (5,39%)
|-
|style="background: bgcolor="#C71585" | Yugoslavs
|1,464 (3,17%)
|2,783 (6,80%)
|392 (1,10%)
|-
|style="background: bgcolor="#CC7722" |others and unknown|980 (2,12%)
|570 (1,39%)
|348 (0,98%)
|-
|style="background: bgcolor="#F5DEB3" |total
|46,160
|40,901
|35,503
|}

Currently, town has a population an estimated at 17,000 residents, with municipality numbering 40,276 residents, of which there is 96% Bosniaks, 2% Serbs, 1% Croats and 1% other. With 173 residents per square kilometer it is one of densely populated area in Federation of Bosnia and Herzegovina.

Ethnic structure by settlements, 1991. census

Absolute ethnic majority

Relative ethnic majority

References 

 Official results from the book: Ethnic composition of Bosnia-Herzegovina population, by municipalities and settlements, 1991. census, Zavod za statistiku Bosne i Hercegovine - Bilten no.234, Sarajevo 1991.

Visoko
Visoko